Stephen "Steve" Halliwell (born 13 March 1962) is an English-born Australian professional rugby league footballer who played in the 1980s. He played at club level for the St. George Dragons
Steve Halliwell was the vice-captain of the Australian Schoolboys rugby union tours of New Zealand and Ireland in 1980.

Genealogical information
Steve Halliwell was born in Ince district, Lancashire, England.

Genealogical information
Steve Halliwell is the son of rugby league / of the 1950s and 1960s who played for Wigan; Frank Halliwell.

References

External links
Profile at saints.org.uk

1962 births
Living people
English rugby league players
Australian expatriate sportspeople in England
Gold Coast Chargers players
Leigh Leopards players
Parramatta Eels players
Penrith Panthers players
Place of birth missing (living people)
Rugby league centres
Rugby league players from Wigan
St Helens R.F.C. players
St. George Dragons players
Wakefield Trinity players